Heberden is a surname. It may be:

 Charles Buller Heberden (1849–1921), Principal of Brasenose College, Oxford, and Vice-Chancellor of Oxford University
 Thomas Heberden (1703–1769), F.R.S.  English physician
 Thomas Heberden (priest) (1754–1843), Canon of Exeter cathedral
 William Heberden (1710–1801), English physician
 William Heberden the Younger (1767–1845), English physician

See also
Heberden family tree